Schwandner or Schwantner (to field and place name Schwand/Schwanden, where the forest was swung, e.g. wasted by fire) is a German language habitational surname. Notable people with the name include:

 Ernst-Ludwig Schwandner (1938–2021), German architectural historian and classical archaeologist
 Gerd Schwandner (born 1951), German surgeon and former politician

Schwantner 
 Joseph Schwantner (born 1943), American composer and educator

See also 
 Schwandt

References 

German-language surnames
German toponymic surnames